1958 Rif riots, Rif Revolt or Rif uprising took place in the northern Rif region of Morocco by tribes rebelling against the Moroccan government, motivated by the region's marginalization. The revolt, led by Sellam Amezian, had a clear set of demands: political and social rights, the departure of foreign troops from the country, the return of the resistance leader Abd el-Krim from exile, the dissolution of political parties, the liberation of political prisoners, and the installation of a "people's government" (gouvernement populaire). The coups and protests aimed at overthrowing the monarchy of the sultan and king Mohammed V of Morocco and his Alaouite dynasty in Morocco and forming a democratic republic

Prince Hassan, who was then military chief of staff, promulgated a decree that put the Rif region in a state of emergency and led an army of 20,000–30,000 soldiers to contain the uprising. The soldiers were aided with air support from French pilots. Estimates around 2,000–8,000 inhabitants of the region were killed and thousands more injured. According to El-Khattabi, 8,420 were taken as political prisoners.

Context 
The Rif was at that time the stronghold of the Moroccan National Liberation Army (ALN). This liberation army was founded on 2 October 1955 under the impetus of Abdelkrim El Khattabi, who at the time had called on several Berber warlords from the Atlas and the Rif to work together.

This movement was very active in the Rif in 1955, with skirmishes against French positions. The ALN supporters were in favour of armed struggle while the Istiqlal Party supporters were negotiating independence with France and Spain. This was finally obtained in 1956 and it was the Istiqlal that took power in Morocco.

The ALN refused to recognise this independence because France and Spain were still present in Morocco and therefore continued the armed struggle in the Rif and in the Atlas, entering into open conflict with the Istiqlal party. The latter, led by Abdelkhalek Torres, Mehdi Ben Barka and Allal Al Fassi, committed numerous crimes (assassinations and kidnappings) against ALN sympathisers. Haddou Aqchich and Abbas Lamsaadi, fighters and emblematic figures of the ALN were assassinated. The Riffian population, feeling more and more marginalised and attacked by the Istiqlal party in power, decided to revolt in October 1958.

Timeline
According to the Moroccan researcher Hsain Ilahiane, the revolts were ignited by the closure of the Algerian border to Rif migration, leading to unemployment, in addition to the total lack of Rif political representation in the Moroccan government.

In October 1958, riots started in the Rif region, as a result of marginalization of the region by the central authority. Sellam Amezian directed this movement. On 7 October 1958, the protesters issued a chart with a list of demands including "The immediate withdraw of all foreign forces from Morocco, and the return of Abd el-Krim and his family to the country".

Although very poorly armed and with almost no foreign support, Ameziane's two to three thousand men (mainly ex-Spanish Legion, the ALN, and Khattabi's army) inflicted several severe defeats on the royal army. About a thousand soldiers lost their lives. The Crown Prince's plane was even shot down by insurgent fire, but Hassan escaped. The fighting was so fierce, especially in the Beni Ouriaghel and Gueznaya, that the army resorted to aviation, artillery and (French) tanks to gain the upper hand. It was only two weeks later that the insurgents were routed. Their leaders were either arrested or fled. Amezian took refuge in Spain at first, then went to Egypt and Iraq.

On 11 November 1958, Ameziane of the PDI and two other members from the Rif, Abdel Sadaq Khattabi and Abdelkrim al-Khattabi's son, Rachid, presented an 18-point programme for the Rif to Mohammed V. This programme encompassed the concerns of the Rifans, ranging from the evacuation of foreign troops from the Rif, the return of Abdelkrim al-Khattabi to Morocco, job creation, political representation and tax reductions. However, before this programme was presented to the king, the Rif revolt had already started for almost three weeks. On 25 October 1958, the Istiqlal Party offices in Imzoûrene were stormed and government soldiers were overpowered. It was here that the uprising took the form of a real revolt.

On 26 December, a harka (a punitive expedition) was decided. The Moroccan prince Hassan II directed the operations from Tetouan. On the ground, it was Commander Oufkir who directed the most decisive operations. Four fifths of the army, i.e. 20,000 men, were deployed in the region. To legitimise this action, Mohammed V gave a speech on 5 January 1959. He castigated the insurgents and gave them forty-eight hours to surrender. In reality, the operations had already started on 2 January 1959. In parallel to the military operations, the monarchy imposed a media blackout. Journalists, especially foreigners, are banned from the region. Those who dare to venture there without permission are arrested and turned away. This is the case of the correspondents of several French, English and American media. Moroccan newspapers, whatever their political colour, are content to reproduce the information blown to them by the authorities and to publish editorials on command crying conspiracy. Publications that deviate from the official script are automatically censored.

The events escalated quickly, and weapons started to be used by both the protesters and the army. The uprising was fiercely oppressed by the army, even using aircraft flown by French pilots. Hundreds were killed and thousands were arrested and wounded. Abd El-Karim estimated the number of detainees in the wake of the Rif uprising at 8,420.

Aftermath
The Moroccan army lost about a thousand men, while 3,000 Riffian rebels were killed and 8,420 were captured. After the end of the uprising, the Rif was subjected to military rule for several years. This, along with the diversion of much of the region's arable land for cannabis planting, has decimated the local economy and environment. As a result, many left the Rif for Europe, returning to their ancestral towns only to build homes that they lived in during vacations or after retirement.

See also
Hirak Rif

References

External links 
 Documentary on Sellam Amezian (in Arabic and Berber).

1958 in Morocco
1958 protests
1959 in Morocco
1959 protests
Berber history
Berber separatism in North Africa
Rebellions in Morocco
Demonstrations
Protests in Morocco
Rif
20th-century revolutions
History of Morocco